The New Zealand roughy (Aulotrachichthys novaezelandicus) is a slimehead found in the Southwest Pacific off the coasts Australia and New Zealand between depths of . It feeds on crustaceans, squid, and other fish.

References

External links
 

New Zealand roughy
Marine fish of Eastern Australia
Marine fish of New Zealand
New Zealand roughy